Ariel "Pepi" Zapata (born 2 September 1974 in Florencio Varela) is an Argentine retired footballer who last played for Newell's Old Boys.

Zapata started his playing career in 1992 with Estudiantes de La Plata. in his first season with the club they won the second division championship. He played with the club in the Argentine Primera División until 2004, when he was signed by Newell's Old Boys manager Américo Gallego.

In his first season with Newell's he was part of the squad that won the Apertura 2004 championship. He went on to make over 100 appearances for the club.

Zapata retired from professional football on 12 December 2008 in a match against Racing Club. Zapata missed a penalty in that match, which Hernán Bernardello put in after the kick.

Titles

External links
  Argentine Primera statistics

1977 births
Living people
People from Florencio Varela Partido
Argentine footballers
Association football midfielders
Estudiantes de La Plata footballers
Newell's Old Boys footballers
Argentina youth international footballers
Sportspeople from Buenos Aires Province